John Roberts  (born 1857) was a Welsh international footballer. He was part of the Wales national football team between 1879 and 1883, playing 7 matches and scoring 1 goal. He played his first match on 7 April 1879 against Scotland and his last match on 3 February 1883 against England.

At club level he played on the Left Wing for Corwen and Berwyn Rangers.

See also
 List of Wales international footballers (alphabetical)

References

1857 births
Welsh footballers
Wales international footballers
People from Llangollen
Sportspeople from Denbighshire
Year of death missing
Association football wingers
Berwyn Rangers F.C. players
Corwen F.C. players